Events in Oceania, during 2019.

Events

April

April 3
General elections were held in the Solomon Islands. They were the first general elections since the RAMSI mission concluded in 2017. On 24 April 2019, Manasseh Sogavare was elected by the 11th National Parliament as Prime Minister of Solomon Islands.

August
 August 13 
 Samoan police confirmed they had foiled an assassination plot against Prime Minister Tuilaepa Sailele Malielegaoi.
 August 24
Parliamentary elections were held in Nauru. President Baron Waqa lost his seat in Boe Constituency, making him ineligible for a third term. Following the elections, Lionel Aingimea was elected president, winning a parliamentary vote 12–6 against David Adeang.

September
 September 9
General elections were held in Tuvalu. Enele Sopoaga, the caretaker prime minister was re-elected to parliament. However, the members of parliament elected Kausea Natano as prime minister.

November

 November 23 – 2019 Bougainvillean independence referendum.
 81 deaths from measles outbreak from lack of vaccination in Samoa

December

 5 December 
The deadly measles epidemic in Samoa has led to the United Nations' World Health Organization to deploy 128 medical teams to assist in vaccination efforts. The UN's Central Emergency Response Fund (CERF) allocated $2.7 million to support the response. 
December 7 A non-binding independence referendum was held in Bougainville, an autonomous region of Papua New Guinea, between 23 November and 7 December 2019. 
 December 11 - The results of the referendum are announced. Over 98% of the votes are in favour of independence.

See also
 	

 List of elections in 2019 in Oceania		
 2019 Oceania Cup (rugby league)

Articles on Elections 
Micronesian parliamentary election, 2019 5 March 2019
Australia
New South Wales state election, 2019 23 March 2019
Tasmanian Legislative Council election, 2019 4 May 2019
Australian federal election, 2019 18 May 2019
Solomon Islands general election, 2019 3 April 2019
Nauruan parliamentary election, 2019 24 August 2019
New Zealand local elections, 2019 12 October 2019
Bougainvillean independence referendum 23 November 2019
Marshallese general election, 2019 18 November 2019
Kiribati parliamentary election, 2019 December 2019

References